Saulog Transit Inc. is a bus transportation company in the Philippines servicing routes between Metro Manila, Cavite and Central Luzon.

Etymology
Saulog Transit Inc. was named after its founder, the late Eliseo Basa Saulog. Eliseo was fondly called Sayong by those close to him and Don Eliseo to every one else. His wife was the pride of Malagasang 1st, Imus, Cavite, Philippines no other than Nieves Arguelles. They were blessed with nine children as follows: Ignacio, Luciano, Teodoro, Virginia, Dr. Melquiades, Ruben, Maura Saulog-Aguinaldo, Lilia Saulog-Venturina and Dr. Marietta Saulog-Vergara.

History
The company started operation in 1946 with orangy yellow, silver and dark green bus paint design. In 1974, Saulog Transit Inc. acquired the franchise of Villarey Transit, which it used to operate its sister company, Dagupan Bus Co., Inc. initially with only six Mitsubishi Fuso buses as part of its expansion in Northern Luzon.

It was in 2010 when Saulog Transit and Genesis Transport Service Inc. signed a memorandum of agreement for the long time cooperation and allocation of the franchise of the former. Genesis Transport answered all of its assets of Saulog Transit when it was found out that the Saulog clan was unable to shoulder all of the annual contributions to SSS, Pag-ibig and PhilHealth. Hence, Saulog Transit and Dagupan Bus Co., Inc. acquired new bus units.

Issues and controversies
Due to some complaints made by some Manilan commuters regarding the entering of provincial buses from Cavite, Laguna, Batangas, and Quezon provinces, Manila Mayor Alfredo Lim issued a memorandum known as Executive Order 13, prohibiting all provincial buses from Southern Tagalog region to enter Manila except for some cases like those coming from Northern Luzon, Bicol Region or Visayas. Another scenario also happened for the second time during Lim's second term as mayor, just to decongest traffic along Taft Avenue. The company also has been accused of breaking municipal rules by picking up passengers at stops other that its designated terminals.

The Quezon City Regional Trial Court issued the writ of preliminary injunction against the Saulog group of companies who attempted to sell their stocks to other bus companies.

Another controversy regarding Saulog Transit Inc. and Dagupan Bus Co., Inc. was that a conflict sparked between the Saulog stake holders after the assassinations of their ancestors. Eliseo Saulog, the founder of Saulog Transit Inc. and father of the Saulog brothers and sisters, Ignacio Saulog, Luciano Saulog, Teodoro Saulog, Virginia Saulog, Dr. Melquiades Saulog, Ruben Saulog, Maura Saulog-Aguinaldo, Lilia Saulog-Venturina, and Dr. Marietta Saulog-Vergara, was shot and killed in 1960 by an unidentified gunman, while the family patriarch, Ruben Saulog, father of the current chief executive and one of the eight children of the founder, was also assassinated in 1990. Until then, the case of such killings are still uncertain and unresolved. The attempts to sell the two companies were assured by the lawyer Bernard Saulog, who got 75% of the total P1.4 B assets, while the 25% of the remaining assets were given to the rest of the clan members. Teodoro Saulog and his clan members refused to give up Saulog Transit Inc. and Dagupan Bus Co., Inc.

Fleet
Saulog Transit Inc., like other major bus companies, has modernized its fleet. Some of its buses are equipped with automatic transmission (GM Allison Automatic Transmission), particularly their engine powered buses. As of now, the company is now utilizing the following:

Yutong ZK6107HA 
Yutong ZK6119HA
Golden Dragon XML6102 
Golden Dragon XML6103 
Golden Dragon XML6127 
Wuzhoulong FGD6128 
Santarosa Daewoo BV115 
Santatosa Daewoo BH117H
Santarosa Daewoo BS106 (Ex-Genesis Transport)
DMMW DM12 Hino RM2PSS
DMMW DM16S2 Volvo B7R
Volvo B8RLE (P2P)

Routes
Pasay/Cubao - Olongapo City via EDSA/NLEX San Fernando Exit
Cavite City - Avenida/Lawton via PITX/CAVITEX
PITX - Olongapo via NLEX/San Fernando Exit
PITX - Cavite City via CAVITEX
PITX - Naic/Ternate via CAVITEX
PITX - Dasmariñas, Cavite via Aguinaldo Highway
Olongapo City - San Fernando, Pampanga via Layac (new normal trips)
Olongapo City - Cabanatuan via San Fernando/Sta. Ana/Arayat
Olongapo City - San Jose City via San Fernando/Cabanatuan
Olongapo City - Santa Cruz via San Antonio/Botolan/Iba/Masinloc

Former Routes
Cubao - Dagupan via Manaoag
Cavite City - Olongapo via SCTEX
Cavite City - Baguio City via NLEX/SCTEX
Avenida/Lawton - Naic/Ternate via CAVITEX
Mendez/Tagaytay - Olongapo City via EDSA/Aguinaldo Highway
Ternate - Olongapo City
Pasay/Cubao - Tagaytay/Mendez via EDSA/Aguinaldo Highway
Avenida/Lawton - Tagaytay/Mendez
Pasay/Cubao - Tagaytay/Mendez

Images

See also
Dagupan Bus Co, Inc.
Genesis Transport Service, Inc.
JAC Liner Inc.

References

Bus companies of the Philippines
Companies based in Parañaque
Transport companies established in 1946
Philippine companies established in 1946